George Alexander Melvin Pearson (April 29, 1938 – January 9, 1999) was a Canadian professional ice hockey forward.

Career 
Pearson played 38 games in the National Hockey League for the Pittsburgh Penguins and New York Rangers. He also played 70 games in the World Hockey Association with the Minnesota Fighting Saints.

Personal life
Pearson had three children, including hockey coach Mel Pearson. Mel is the former head coach of the Michigan Wolverines hockey team. His other son, Ted, was a Calgary Flames draft pick who played over 200 games of professional hockey in the AHL, IHL, and Germany's second-tier Bundesliga.

Career statistics

References

External links
 

1938 births
1999 deaths
Baltimore Clippers players
Canadian ice hockey centres
Flin Flon Bombers coaches
Ice hockey people from Manitoba
Minnesota Fighting Saints players
New York Rangers players
Pittsburgh Penguins players
Sportspeople from Flin Flon
St. Paul Rangers players
Canadian ice hockey coaches